1928 Olympics  may refer to:

The 1928 Winter Olympics, which were held in St. Moritz, Switzerland
The 1928 Summer Olympics, which were held in Amsterdam, Netherlands